Chuvashsko-Sorminskoye Rural Settlement (Chăvash Surăm yal tărăkhĕ) is an administrative and municipal division (a rural settlement) of Alikovsky District of the Chuvash Republic, Russia. It is located in the eastern part of the district. Its administrative center is the rural locality (a selo) of Chuvashskaya Sorma. Rural settlement's population: 1,758 (2006 est.).

Chuvashsko-Sorminskoye Rural Settlement comprises sixteen rural localities.

The Cheboksary–Yadrin highway crosses the territory of the rural settlement.

References

Notes

Sources

Further reading
L. A. Yefimov, "Alikovsky District" ("Элӗк Енӗ"), Alikovo, 1994.
"Аликовская энциклопедия" (Alikovsky District's Encyclopedia), authors: Yefimov L. A., Yefimov Ye. L., Ananyev A. A., Terentyev G. K. Cheboksary, 2009, .

External links
Official website of Chuvashsko-Sorminskoye Rural Settlement 

Alikovsky District
Rural settlements of Chuvashia

